Arun Amarin Road is a road in Thunburi side (west side of Chao Phraya River) of Bangkok. 

Cut as the second of the eleven new roads in Thonburi Province (now Thonburi side) after the inauguration of the Memorial Bridge in 1932, starting from beside Suksanari School in the area of Thon Buri's Wat Kanlaya where it cuts with Prajadhipok Road opposite Wongwian Lek near the foot of Memorial and Phra Pok Klao Bridges.

Then ran through the entrance to many important places of worship include Wat Buppharam, Wat Kanlayanamit, Bang Luang Mosque, before crossing Khlong Bangkok Yai with Anutin Sawat Bridge through Ton Son Mosque, Wat Molilokkayaram in the area of Bangkok Yai's Wat Arun.

The road continues up till it passes in front of Thonburi Palace and Wat Arun at Wang Doem Junction, where it intersects with Wang Doem Road which leads to Bangkok Yai Police Station and Wat Hong Rattanaram.

Arun Amarin Road continues to run to the front of Royal Thai Navy Convention Center, the entrance to Wat Nak Klang and Taweethapisek School with Rajdamnern Technological College (Soi Itsaraphap 42), as well as Wat Khruea Wan.

After crossing Khlong Mon, it entered Bangkok Noi's Siri Rat area fully through Royal Thai Naval Dockyard and Wat Phraya Tham up till it intersects with Soi Saeng Suksa (Soi Itsaraphap 44) at Ban Khamin Junction. Then pass the entrance to Wat Rakhang and pass in front of Wang Lang Market and Siriraj Hospital at Siriraj Intersection, where it intersects with Wang Lang Road (formerly known as Pran Nok Road).

Then it crossed Khlong Bangkok Noi with Arun Amarin Bridge, where is the location of Wat Amarinthraram, Bangkok Noi Railway Station and National Museum of Royal Barges, respectively. It also enters Arun Amarin area.

The last stretch of the road crosses with Somdet Phra Pinklao Road at Arun Amarin Intersection between Pata Pinklao Department Store and foot of Phra Pinklao Bridge with enter Bang Phlat's Bang Yi Khan area and continued to run up till it ended at Chao Phraya River under Rama VIII Bridge beside Rama VIII Park, total distance of 4,900 m (16,076 ft).

The phase between Royal Thai Navy Convention Center to the beside of Suksanari School considered an extension of the original road, it was completed and opened in 1997. This phase is often unofficially called "New Arun Amarin Road" (ถนนอรุณอมรินทร์ตัดใหม่). The footbridge in front of Wat Kalayanamit was built by the temple in 2017 and delivered to Bangkok Metropolitan Administration (BMA) in 2018.

An overpass to alleviate traffic from Royal Thai Naval Dockyard crossing Siriraj Intersection and Arun Amarin Bridge is currently under construction and is expected to open in the first phase in April 2021.

Arun Amarin Road is regarded as the road at the mostly distance parallel to Itsaraphap Road.

Arun Amarin Intersection, where it cuts through Somdet Phra Pinklao Road, is a four-way intersection that has existed since 1973 along with the opening of Phra Pinklao Bridge. It originally had a steel-framed overpass before it was demolished, to build a ramp of the Borommaratchachonnani Elevated Highway in 1995.

References

Streets in Bangkok
Thon Buri district
Bangkok Yai district
Bangkok Noi district
Bang Phlat district